The Bajaj Super was a two-stroke 150 cc motor scooter produced in India by Bajaj Auto between 1976 and 2006.

History
Early models were a licensed reproduction of the Italian-made eight-inch-wheeled Vespa Super.  Production continued even after the licence agreement with Vespa expired in 1977.  In response, Vespa's parent company Piaggio filed patent infringement suits to block Bajaj scooter sales in the United States, United Kingdom, West Germany, and Hong Kong.

Later model Bajaj Supers appear to have incorporated various features of the Vespas VNA, VNB, VBB, Super and Sprint.  For instance, the 1981 model Bajaj Super has near-identical components: Vespa Super body, VNA/VNB/VBB 8-inch wheels, and  Vespa SS180 headlight.

In its early days, there used to be a booking period of at least one year. 

The Bajaj Super has a 150cc 6 BHP at 5500 RPM of engine, with excellent pick up and a top speed of 80 km/h in standard testing conditions.

Technical specifications

Super
Indian motor scooters
Motorcycles introduced in 1976